In graph theory and theoretical computer science, a maximum common induced subgraph of two graphs G and H is a graph that is an induced subgraph of both G and H,
and that has as many vertices as possible.

Finding this graph is NP-hard.
In the associated decision problem, the input is two graphs G and H and a number k. The problem is to decide whether G and H have a common induced subgraph with at least k vertices. This problem is NP-complete. It is a generalization of the induced subgraph isomorphism problem, which arises when k equals the number of vertices in the smaller of G and H, so that this entire graph must appear as an induced subgraph of the other graph.

Based on hardness of approximation results for the maximum independent set problem, the maximum common induced subgraph problem is also hard to approximate.

One possible solution for this problem is to build a modular product graph of G and H.
In this graph, the largest clique corresponds to a maximum common induced subgraph of G and H. Therefore, algorithms for finding maximum cliques can be used to find the maximum common induced subgraph. Moreover, a modified maximum-clique algorithm can be used to find a maximum common connected subgraph.

The McSplit algorithm (along with its McSplit↓ variant) is a forward checking algorithm that does not use the clique encoding, but uses a compact data structure to keep track of the vertices in graph H to which each vertex in graph G may be mapped. Both versions of the McSplit algorithm outperform the clique encoding for many graph classes.

Maximum common induced subgraph algorithms have a long tradition in cheminformatics and pharmacophore mapping.

See also
Molecule mining
Maximum common edge subgraph

References

NP-complete problems
Cheminformatics
Computational problems in graph theory